Kisling is a German language surname. It may refer to:

Jérémie Kisling (born 1976), Swiss singer-songwriter
Moïse Kisling (1891–1953), Polish painter
Richard D. Kisling (1923–1985), American aviator

Other uses
Gutten Kisling, fictional character in the game Okage: Shadow King

See also
Kissling

German-language surnames
Jewish surnames